Killimordaly is a rural village and civil parish in County Galway, Ireland. It was originally located in Trícha Máenmaige.

See also
 Íomar of the Sogain
 List of towns and villages in Ireland

References

Towns and villages in County Galway